On 15 December 1989, KLM Flight 867, en route from Amsterdam to Narita International Airport Tokyo, was forced to make an emergency landing at Anchorage International Airport, Alaska, when all four engines failed. The Boeing 747-400, less than six months old at the time, flew through a thick cloud of volcanic ash from Mount Redoubt, which had erupted the day before.

Engine failure
All four engines failed, leaving only critical systems on backup electrical power. One report assigned the engine shutdown to the conversion of the ash into a glass coating inside the engines that fooled the engine temperature sensors and led to an auto-shutdown of all four engines.

When all four main generators shut off due to the failure of all the engines, a momentary power interruption occurred when the flight instruments transferred to standby power. Standby power on the 747-400 is provided by two batteries and inverters. The captain performed the engine restart procedure, which failed on the first few attempts, and repeated it until restart was achieved. On some of the attempts, as one or more (but not all) engines started to operate, the main generator switched back on. This switching on and off caused repeated power transfer interruptions to the flight instruments. The temporary blanking of the instruments gave the appearance that standby power had failed. These power transfers were later verified from the flight data recorder.

Transcript
The following edited transmissions took place between Anchorage Center, the air traffic control facility for that region, and KLM 867:

Pilot: KLM 867 heavy is reaching level 250 heading 140
Anchorage Center: Okay, Do you have good sight on the ash plume at this time?
Pilot: Yea, it's just cloudy it could be ashes. It's just a little browner than the normal cloud.
Pilot: We have to go left now: it's smoky in the cockpit at the moment, sir.
Anchorage Center: KLM 867 heavy, roger, left at your discretion.
Pilot: Climbing to level 390, we're in a black cloud, heading 130.
Pilot: KLM 867 we have flame out all engines and we are descending now!
Anchorage Center: KLM 867 heavy, Anchorage?
Pilot: KLM 867 heavy, we are descending now: we are in a fall!
Pilot: KLM 867, we need all the assistance you have, sir. Give us radar vectors please!

Recovery and aftermath

After descending more than 14,000 ft (4250 m), the crew restarted the engines and safely landed the plane. In this case, the ash caused more than US$80 million in damage to the aircraft, requiring all four engines to be replaced, but there were no human deaths and no one was injured. A shipment of 25 African birds, two genets, and 25 tortoises aboard the plane was diverted to an Anchorage warehouse, where eight birds and three tortoises died before the mislabeled shipment was discovered.

KLM continues to operate the Amsterdam-Tokyo route, but as Flight 861, and it is now a nonstop eastbound flight using a Boeing 787. Flight 867 is now used for flights between Amsterdam and Osaka.

The aircraft, PH-BFC, remained in service with KLM until its retirement from the fleet on 14 March 2018. It joined the KLM Asia fleet upon the subsidiary's establishment in 1995, until it was returned to KLM in 2012 and repainted in the standard KLM livery after a maintenance check.

See also

British Airways Flight 009
List of airline flights that required gliding
Ring of Fire
Volcanic ash and aviation safety

References

External links
Airliners.Net – Picture of the plane that carried KLM Flight 867

"NTSB Identification: ANC90FA020." National Transportation Safety Board — Record of the incident
Photo PH-BFC KLM Royal Dutch Airlines Boeing 747-406(M), 14 October 1989
U.S. Department of the Interior | U.S. Geological Survey 
Flightglobal 9 January 1990 {Volcano Flames Out KLM 747}
Volcanic Hazards Impacts on Aviation, U.S. Senate Commerce Committee
 Cockpit audio recording via  phys.org

Airliner accidents and incidents caused by engine failure
Airliner accidents and incidents caused by volcanic events
Airliner accidents and incidents in Alaska
Aviation accidents and incidents in the United States in 1989
Accidents and incidents involving the Boeing 747
867
1989 in Alaska
December 1989 events in the United States
Ted Stevens Anchorage International Airport